The 2012–13 Stetson Hatters men's basketball team represented Stetson University during the 2012–13 NCAA Division I men's basketball season. The Hatters, led by second year head coach Casey Alexander, played their home games at the Edmunds Center and were members of the Atlantic Sun Conference. They finished the season 15–16, 11–7 in A-Sun play to finish in third place. They advanced to the semifinals of the Atlantic Sun tournament where they lost to Florida Gulf Coast.

Roster

Schedule
 
|-
!colspan=9| Exhibition

|-
!colspan=9| Regular season

|-
!colspan=9| 2013 Atlantic Sun men's basketball tournament

References

Stetson Hatters men's basketball seasons
Stetson
Stetson Hatters
Stetson Hatters